The Poet and the Boy is a 2017 South Korean comedy-drama film       written and directed by Kim Yang-hee.

Cast
 Yang Ik-june as Hyon Taek-gi
 Jeon Hye-jin as Mrs. Hyon
 Jung Ga-ram as Se-yun
 Won Mi-yun as Old mother 
 Bang Eun-hee as Se-yun's mother 
 Inan as Se-yun's father
 Kim Myeong-jin as Girl
Kim Jong-soo as Dong In's Chairman
 Kim Sung-kyun as Friend (special appearance)

Awards and nominations

References

External links

The Poet and the Boy at Naver Movies 

2017 films
South Korean comedy-drama films
2017 comedy-drama films
Films about poets
2017 LGBT-related films
LGBT-related comedy-drama films
South Korean LGBT-related films
Films shot in Jeju
Films set in Jeju
2017 directorial debut films
2010s South Korean films